Duncan Harris (born 27 April 1941) is a former  Australian rules footballer who played with Hawthorn in the Victorian Football League (VFL).

Notes

External links 

Living people
1941 births
Australian rules footballers from Victoria (Australia)
Hawthorn Football Club players
University Blacks Football Club players
People educated at Scotch College, Melbourne